Bromus pannonicus is a species of flowering plant in the family Poaceae which can be found in such European countries as Czech Republic, Hungary, Romania, and all states of former Yugoslavia.

Description
It also has an open panicle which can either be lanceolate or oblong and is measured to be  in length.

References

pannonicus
Flora of Europe